Robert Thomas "Butch" Goring (born October 22, 1949) is a Canadian former professional ice hockey player. He played 16 seasons in the National Hockey League (NHL) for the Los Angeles Kings, New York Islanders and Boston Bruins. A four-time Stanley Cup winner with the Islanders, he has been cited as a key figure of the Islander dynasty.

Since retiring as a player he has served as head coach of both the Bruins and Islanders. He currently serves as the Islanders' television color commentator on MSG Network alongside Islanders play-by-play announcer Brendan Burke.

Playing career
After finishing his junior career with the Dauphin Kings of the Manitoba Junior Hockey League (MJHL), Goring was drafted by the Los Angeles Kings in the fifth round (51st overall) of the 1969 NHL Entry Draft. He played parts of two seasons for the Kings in 1970 and 1971, bouncing back and forth between Los Angeles and their American Hockey League (AHL) affiliate, the Springfield Kings. He had a very successful season in Springfield in 1971, leading the league in playoff goals, assists and points in helping his team (along with future Hall of Fame goaltender and future Islanders' teammate Billy Smith) win the Calder Cup championship.

The next season Goring was promoted for good to the NHL, and starred for nine seasons for the Los Angeles Kings, developing into one of the most complete players in the league. In the 1975–76 playoff quarterfinal series against the Boston Bruins, Goring scored the overtime game-winning goal in game 2 and game 6. He won both the Bill Masterton Trophy and the Lady Byng Memorial Trophy in 1978, becoming the first player to win both trophies the same year. Prior to the 1978–79 season he was offered a five-year, $1-million contract by the World Hockey Association's Edmonton Oilers; Goring re-signed with the Kings after they countered with an offer of $1.25-million over the same term.

In the 1980 season, Goring was traded in March to the New York Islanders in exchange for Billy Harris and Dave Lewis, and was widely regarded as being the "final piece of the puzzle". That season, he scored 19 points in 21 playoff games to help the Islanders to the first of four consecutive Stanley Cups. The next season (1980–81), he improved upon his previous playoff run, scoring 10 goals and 10 assists in 20 playoff games, and was awarded the Conn Smythe Trophy as the playoff most valuable player, as the Islanders won their second Cup. Goring played 78 games and did not receive a single penalty, but did not win the Lady Byng Trophy that year.

Goring's final NHL season was 1985. After his release by the Islanders, he played effectively for half a season with the Boston Bruins, before retiring and becoming the Bruins' head coach for a season and a half. After he was fired as the Bruins' coach in 1987, he played briefly for the Nova Scotia Oilers of the AHL before retiring for good.

Goring retired having played 1107 games, with 375 goals and 513 assists for 888 points. He recorded only 102 penalty minutes, the lowest total in NHL history for a player appearing in more than a thousand games. He was a very effective penalty-killer throughout his career as he finished in the top ten for short-handed goals nine seasons in his career amassing a career total of 40 short-handed goals, the fifth most of all-time.

Legacy
Goring was most recognizable on the ice for the Sven Tumba-endorsed Spaps brand helmet that he had worn since childhood and continued to wear throughout his entire professional career. He also developed a reputation for perhaps the poorest fashion sense in the league. In the 1970s, on a road trip with the Kings, a burglar broke into his hotel room and stole everything that belonged to his roommate but left all of Goring's clothes hanging in the closet untouched.

Former Islanders' teammate Mike Bossy stated on a 2010 episode of Off the Record with Michael Landsberg that Goring is quite likely the originator of the NHL's tradition of growing a beard in the Stanley Cup playoffs, commonly called a "playoff beard". Other former Islanders, including Dave Lewis and Clark Gillies, point to the tradition starting in the mid-1970s, before Goring's time with the team, although Goring certainly participated in the tradition once he joined the Islanders.

Goring's No. 91 was retired by the Islanders on February 29, 2020, ahead of a game against the Boston Bruins.

Career statistics

Regular season and playoffs

International

Coaching career
Goring served two stints as an NHL head coach.  He coached the Bruins in the 1985–86 season and the early part of the following campaign; he also coached the New York Islanders in the 1999–2000 season and most of the following season – he was fired by the Islanders on March 4, 2001.  He also served as the head coach for several minor league teams, including
the Capital District Islanders, Las Vegas Thunder, Denver Grizzlies, Utah Grizzlies, and Anchorage Aces, winning two championships. In 2002–2003 he took over the Krefeld Penguins of the Deutsche Eishockey Liga and led them to their first championship since 1952. In 2004–2005, he was the coach of the DEG Metro Stars hockey team in Germany.

Coaching record

Career achievements
 MJHL Hockey Ability and Sportsmanship Award winner (1967)
 Turnbull Cup (MJHL championship) (1969)
 Calder Cup (AHL championship) (1971)
 Bill Masterton Trophy winner (1978)
 Lady Byng Trophy winner (1978)
 Played in NHL All-Star Game (1980)
 Conn Smythe Trophy winner (1981)
 Stanley Cup champion (1980, 1981, 1982, 1983)
 Played in the Canada Cup Tournament for Team Canada (1981)
 Named Manitoba's Athlete of the Year (1981)
 IHL Coach of Year (1995 and 1996)
 Turner Cup (IHL) Championships (1995 and 1996)
 The last active player that had played during the 1960s
 Inducted into the Manitoba Sports Hall of Fame and Museum in 1992
 "Honoured Member" of the Manitoba Hockey Hall of Fame
 Jersey number 91 retired by the New York Islanders organization (2020)

See also
 List of NHL players with 1,000 games played

References

External links
 
 Profile at hockeydraftcentral.com

1949 births
Living people
Bill Masterton Memorial Trophy winners
Boston Bruins coaches
Boston Bruins players
Canadian expatriate ice hockey players in the United States
Canadian ice hockey centres
Canadian ice hockey coaches
Conn Smythe Trophy winners
Dauphin Kings players
Frankfurt Lions coaches
Manitoba Sports Hall of Fame inductees
Ice hockey player-coaches
Lady Byng Memorial Trophy winners
Los Angeles Kings draft picks
Los Angeles Kings players
Kildonan North Stars players
New York Islanders announcers
New York Islanders coaches
New York Islanders players
Nova Scotia Oilers players
People from Saint Boniface, Winnipeg
Regina Pats players
Spokane Chiefs coaches
Ice hockey people from Winnipeg
Springfield Kings players
Stanley Cup champions
Winnipeg Jets (WHL) players
Winnipeg Rangers players